Cross-country skiing at the 2012 Youth Winter Olympics took place at the Cross-Country World Cup Course at the Seefeld Arena in Seefeld, Austria from 14 to 16 January. Five events were contested (2 per gender) and a mixed relay with biathlon athletes.

Medal summary

Medal table

Events

Qualification System

References

 
2012 Winter Youth Olympics events
2012 in cross-country skiing
2012
Youth Olympics